Dioszeghyana is a moth genus in the family Noctuidae.

Species
 Dioszeghyana mirabilis (Sugi, 1955)
 Dioszeghyana nigrialba (Yoshimoto, 1993)
 Dioszeghyana schmidtii (Diószeghy, 1935)

References
Natural History Museum Lepidoptera genus database
Dioszeghyana at funet

Orthosiini